William E. Larson (July 26, 1938 – September 19, 2015) was an American football player who played with the Boston Patriots. He played college football at Illinois Wesleyan University.

References

1938 births
2015 deaths
American football fullbacks
Illinois Wesleyan Titans football players
Boston Patriots players
Players of American football from Illinois
Sportspeople from Rockford, Illinois